Maximum Effort is a film production company and digital marketing agency founded by Ryan Reynolds and George Dewey. The company name is a reference to a catchphrase from Reynolds' film Deadpool and subsequent film series.

History
Ryan Reynolds and George Dewey launched Maximum Effort in 2018, after having collaborated on the marketing campaign for the first two Deadpool films. They worked on a series of successful low-budget ads to promote the 2016 film and its 2018 sequel, which at the time were the highest-grossing R-rated films ever. Dewey, formerly senior vice president of digital marketing at 20th Century Fox and president of digital marketing at Annapurna Pictures, was named president of the company, and Reynolds is creative director.

Maximum Effort's marketing arm was acquired by advertising software company MNTN in June 2021, with Maximum Effort Marketing keeping its name while operating as an agency within MNTN. Reynolds was named MNTN's chief creative officer, and Dewey MNTN's chief brand officer.

Film & TV production
Maximum Effort was one of the production companies on the 2018 film Deadpool 2, directed by David Leitch and starring Reynolds and Josh Brolin, 2021's Free Guy, directed by Shawn Levy and starring Reynolds and Jodie Comer, and on 2022's The Adam Project, directed by Levy and starring Reynolds, Mark Ruffalo, Jennifer Garner and Walker Scobell.

Upcoming Maximum Effort Productions projects include the musical Spirited, directed by Sean Anders and starring Reynolds and Will Ferrell.

In May 2021, Maximum Effort Productions closed a three-year first-look development deal with Paramount Pictures for all their feature films.

In August 2022, it was announced Maximum Effort will launch a linear TV channel on FuboTV.

Marketing
Maximum Effort Marketing has created ads for Reynolds' brands Aviation Gin and Mint Mobile, films such as Deadpool 2 and Free Guy, and for Match.com, R.M. Williams, and the NAACP Legal Defense Fund. One of the Aviation Gin spots went viral, as a spoof on a Peloton holiday commercial that had received significant backlash, with both ads starring the same actress, Monica Ruiz. A spot for Mint Mobile featured Rick Moranis, in a rare public appearance for the actor, and an advertising stunt for Aviation Gin and Laughing Man Coffee had a faux Twitter war between Reynolds and Hugh Jackman. A video for Match.com went viral at the end of 2020, as it featured Satan dating the year 2020 and debuted Taylor Swift's re-recording of her song "Love Story".

In December 2021, following the release of the Sex and the City revival series And Just Like That..., and the death of Mr. Big on a Peloton bike, shares in Peloton fell. Maximum Effort quickly devised an advertisement for Peloton featuring Chris Noth. Reynolds provided the voiceover promoting the health benefits that cycling can have, and noting that Chris Noth/Mr. Big was still alive.

Filmography

Film

Short film

Television

References

Mass media companies established in 2018
Film production companies of the United States
Television production companies of the United States
Advertising agencies of the United States
Digital marketing companies of the United States
2018 establishments in New York (state)